Sentiki Nayalo (born 15 March 1994) is a Fijian rugby union player for Coventry and serving British Army Soldier.

'Tiki' signed to play for Coventry for the 2019–2020 season in the Greenking IPA RFU Championship. He played for London Irish in 2016 before moving north of the border to Guinness Pro14 side Edinburgh Rugby for the beginning of the 2018 campaign.

He serves as a Gunner in 7 Parachute Regiment, Royal Horse Artillery where he was given the nickname Shane.

References

1992 births
Living people
Rugby union flankers
Fijian rugby union players
London Irish players
Edinburgh Rugby players
Fijian expatriate rugby union players
Expatriate rugby union players in Scotland

Coventry R.F.C. players